Yuliya Vitalyevna Rissik (born January 13, 1987) is a Kazakh former swimmer, who specialized in freestyle events. Rissik qualified for the women's 200 m freestyle at the 2004 Summer Olympics in Athens, by clearing a FINA B-cut of 2:06.02 from the Kazakhstan Open Championships in Almaty. Swimming in heat one, she finished the race in last place and forty-first overall against Thailand's Pilin Tachakittiranan and Chinese Taipei's Yang Chin-Kuei with a slowest time of 2:09.93.

References

1987 births
Living people
Olympic swimmers of Kazakhstan
Swimmers at the 2004 Summer Olympics
Kazakhstani female freestyle swimmers
People from Karaganda Region